Northridge Mall is a shopping mall in Salinas, California, the largest in Monterey County. Located off Highway 101 near Boronda Road and North Main Street in the northern part of the city, the single-story structure encompasses  of retail space. Northridge Mall features more than 110 shops, two restaurants, a fast-food court with eight outlets (2 vacant), a Round One Entertainment, and three department stores including Hobby Lobby, JCPenney, and Macy's with one vacant anchor last occupied by Sears. It receives 7.2 million visitors annually with approximately 3,000 spaces in the open-air parking lot. It’s the only indoor shopping mall between San Jose and Santa Maria.

History
Northridge Mall opened in 1972 with 60 stores and Emporium Capwells, JCPenney, and Mervyns as anchor stores. It was owned by the insurance company Northwestern Mutual. Sears moved from its original South Main Street location to its mall location in 1977. At the time though, it was neither connected to nor affiliated with the mall. It was not until the new south wing was added in 1982 that the pre-existing Sears outlet became part of the mall. The new wing also nearly doubled the shopping center's retail space and stores.

In 1994 the mall was remodeled and in 1996 the Emporium Capwells outlet was replaced by Macy's; both Sears and JCPenney underwent extensive remodels. In 1998, the Mervyns outlet was extensively remodeled to incorporate the brand's new image.

Macerich acquired Northridge Mall in 2003 from Northwestern Mutual for a purchase price of approximately $128.5 million.

Starwood Capital Group purchased Northridge Mall in 2013 from Macerich for a purchase price of approximately $120 million.

In 2015, Sears Holdings spun off 235 of its properties, including the Sears at Northridge Mall, into Seritage Growth Properties. 

On November 4, 2016, JCPenney opened a new 127,000 sq. ft. one-story building on the west side of the mall facing the 101 freeway. The former building was set to become new mall shops on the first floor which would connect the east and west side of the mall. An entertainment complex was set to take over the former second floor of JCPenney. After the relocation of JCPenney, the mall added new seating and new flooring throughout the entire mall. 

On March 9,  2019, Round 1 opened as the entertainment center in the former JCPenney's second story. Also, Forever 21 moved from the anchor building next to JCPenney to a location inside the mall. The former Forever 21 became Hobby Lobby and opened on September 16, 2019.

A Panera Bread location was built detached from the mall which opened in mid 2019. After Panera opened, a new building broke ground, which was set to open as a Chick-fil-A.  Chick-fil-A opened on April 8, 2021.On November 14, 2019, it was announced that Forever 21 would be closing this location as part of a plan to close 111 stores nationwide. The store closed in January 2020. 

Sears closed in 2020.

References

External links
 Northridge Mall Official website

Shopping malls in Monterey County, California
Shopping malls established in 1974
Buildings and structures in Salinas, California